Absolute Beginners may refer to:

Absolute Beginners (novel), a 1959 novel by Colin MacInnes.
Absolute Beginners (film), a 1986 rock musical film based on the novel.
Absolute Beginners: The Original Motion Picture Soundtrack, the soundtrack album to the 1986 film Absolute Beginners.
"Absolute Beginners" (David Bowie song), a 1986 single by David Bowie, title song from the above film.
Absolute Beginners, a play written by Trevor Griffiths for the 1974 television series Fall of Eagles.
"Absolute Beginners" (The Jam song), a 1981 single by The Jam.

See also
Beginner (band), the German rap group formerly known as 'Absolute Beginner'.